Cryptandra pendula is a flowering plant in the family Rhamnaceae and is endemic to the southwest of Western Australia. It is a shrub with linear leaves and clusters of 5 to 15 pendulous, white, tube-shaped flowers.

Description
The edges of the leaves are rolled under, concealing most of the lower surface that is densely covered with white, star-shaped hairs. The flowers are borne in spike-like clusters of 5 to 15 on densely hairy peduncles. Flowering occurs in July and August.

Taxonomy and naming
Cryptandra pendula was first formally described in 2007 by Barbara Lynette Rye in the journal Nuytsia from specimens collected in 2005 near Allanooka, south-east of Geraldton in the Shire of Irwin. The specific epithet (pendula ) means "drooping", referring to the flowers and fruit.

Distribution
This cryptandra is only known from the type location, where it grows in lateritic gravel on a hillside with several species of Melaleuca in the Geraldton Sandplains bioregion of south-western Western Australia.

Conservation status
Cryptandra pendula is listed as "Priority One" by the Government of Western Australia Department of Biodiversity, Conservation and Attractions, meaning that it is known from only one or a few locations that are potentially at risk.

References

pendula
Rosales of Australia
Flora of Western Australia
Plants described in 2007
Taxa named by Barbara Lynette Rye